Omba or OMBA may refer to:

Omba, Missouri, an historic town in eastern Douglas County, Missouri
Omba Island, Indonesia
Omba Island, another name for Ambae Island, Vanuatu
Omba language, another name for East Ambae language, an Oceanic language spoken on Vanuatu
Online Master of Business Administration
Ocala Mountain Biking Association, organization that maintains the Santos Trail System in Florida

See also
Omba Mokomba, 1997–1999 Disney Channel nature show